LMCS may refer to:

 Lockheed Martin Control Systems, the former name of the Platform Solutions division of BAE Systems Electronics, Intelligence & Support
 Logical Methods in Computer Science, a scientific journal in theoretical computer science
 IEEE 802, the LAN/MAN Standards Committee (LMCS)

See also

 LMC (disambiguation)